Krukowo may refer to the following places:
Krukowo, Greater Poland Voivodeship (west-central Poland)
Krukowo, Kuyavian-Pomeranian Voivodeship (north-central Poland)
Krukowo, Masovian Voivodeship (east-central Poland)